Mary Jane Lee (September 4, 1848 – August 5, 1925), known professionally as Jennie Lee, was an American actress of the stage and screen.

Lee appeared in more than 50 films between 1912 and 1924, working especially in character parts under the directors John Ford and D. W. Griffith. She began her stage career at age nine and went on to support such actors as John Edward McCullough, Joseph Jefferson, Edwin Booth, and Helena Modjeska. She and her husband, actor William Courtright, appeared together in Griffith's Intolerance (1916). Lee portrayed Mammy in The Birth of a Nation (1915).  Another notable performance of the actress occurs in Lloyd Ingraham's A Child of the Paris Streets, in which she portrays Madame Dufrane.

Selected filmography

 The Mothering Heart (Griffith, 1913, Short) - The Wash Customer
 The Sorrowful Shore (Griffith, 1913, Short) - On Shore (uncredited)
 Two Men of the Desert (Griffith, 1913, Short) - Old Indian Woman
 The Battle at Elderbush Gulch (Griffith, 1913, Short) - The Waifs' Guardian
 Judith of Bethulia (Griffith, 1913) - Bethulian
 The Yaqui Cur (1913) as Yaqui Woman
 Almost a Wild Man (1913) as In Audience
 Brute Force (Griffith, 1914, Short) - Cavewoman
 The Birth of a Nation (Griffith, 1915) - Mammy - The Faithful Servant
 The Slave Girl (Browning, 1915, Short)
 Her Shattered Idol (1915) - Ben's Mother
 A Child of the Paris Streets (1916) - Madame Dufrane
 An Innocent Magdalene (Dwan, 1916) - Mammy
 Pillars of Society (1916) - Nurse (uncredited)
 Intolerance (1916) - Woman at Jenkins Employees Dance (uncredited)
 The Little Liar (1916) - Boardinghouse Keeper 
 The Children Pay (Ingraham, 1916) - Susan - the Girls' Governess
 Nina, the Flower Girl (Ingraham, 1917) - Nina's grandmother
 Stage Struck (Morrissey, 1917) - Mrs. Teedles
 A Woman's Awakening (1917) - Mammie
 Her Official Fathers (1917) - Aunt Lydia
 Souls Triumphant (O'Brien, 1917)
 Madame Bo-Peep (1917) - Housekeeper
 The Innocent Sinner (1917) - Mother Ellis
 The Clever Mrs. Carfax (1917) - Mrs. Mary Keyes
 Sandy (1918) - Aunt Melvy
 Riders of Vengeance (Ford, 1919) - Harry's Mother
 Bill Henry (Storm, 1919) - Aunt Martha Jenkins
 Rider of the Law (Ford, 1919) - Jim's Mother
 The Secret Gift (1920) - Aunt Soiphie
 The Big Punch (Ford, 1921) - Buck's Mother
 One Man in a Million (1921) - Mrs. Koppel
 North of Hudson Bay (Ford, 1923) - Mother Dane
 Young Ideas (1924) - Grandma
 Hearts of Oak (Ford, 1924) - Grandma Dunnivan

Resources

External links

1848 births
1925 deaths
19th-century American actresses
American stage actresses
20th-century American actresses
American film actresses
American silent film actresses
Actresses from Sacramento, California